Professor Eugene O'Brien is a professor of Civil Engineering at University College Dublin.

Prior to joining academia he worked for a number of Engineering companies including G Maunsell & Partners and Mott MacDonald during the course of which he designed a number of bridges. In his later career he established a software company, Tower Software, which concentrated on developing software for engineers.

References

Academics of University College Dublin
Irish civil engineers
Living people
Year of birth missing (living people)